The meaning of the word American in the English language varies according to the historical, geographical, and political context in which it is used. American is derived from America, a term originally denoting all of the Americas (also called the Western Hemisphere). In some expressions, it retains this Pan-American sense, but its usage has evolved over time and, for various historical reasons, the word came to denote people or things specifically from the United States.

In modern English, American generally refers to persons or things related to the United States of America; among native English speakers this usage is almost universal, with any other use of the term requiring specification. However, some linguists in the past have argued that "American" should be widened to also include people or things from anywhere in the American continents.

The word can be used as either an adjective or a noun (viz. a demonym). In adjectival use, it means "of or relating to the United States"; for example, "Elvis Presley was an American singer" or "the man prefers American English". In its noun form, the word generally means a resident or citizen of the U.S., but is also used for someone whose ethnic identity is simply "American". The noun is rarely used in English to refer to people not connected to the United States when intending a geographical meaning. When used with a grammatical qualifier, the adjective American can mean "of or relating to the Americas", as in Latin American or Indigenous American. Less frequently, the adjective can take this meaning without a qualifier, as in "American Spanish dialects and pronunciation differ by country" or the names of the Organization of American States and the American Registry for Internet Numbers (ARIN). A third use of the term pertains specifically to the indigenous peoples of the Americas, for instance, "In the 16th century, many Americans died from imported diseases during the European conquest", though this usage is rare, as "indigenous", "First Nations" or "Amerindian" are considered less confusing and generally more appropriate.

Compound constructions which indicate a minority ethnic group, such as "African-Americans" likewise refer exclusively to people in or from the United States of America, as does the prefix "Americo-". For instance, the Americo-Liberians and their language Merico derive their name from the fact that they are descended from African-American settlers, i.e. Blacks who were formerly enslaved in the United States of America.

Other languages

French, German, Italian, Japanese, Hebrew, Arabic, and Russian speakers may use cognates of American to refer to inhabitants of the Americas or to U.S. nationals. They generally have other terms specific to U.S. nationals, such as the German , French , Japanese , and Italian . These specific terms may be less common than the term American.

Note that in normal parlance, the adjective "American" and its direct cognates are usually used if the context renders the nationality of the person clear.

This differentiation is prevalent in German-speaking countries, as indicated by the style manual of the Neue Zürcher Zeitung (one of the leading German-language newspapers in Switzerland) which dismisses the term  as both 'unnecessary' and 'artificial' and recommends replacing it with amerikanisch.

Portuguese has , denoting both a person or thing from the Americas and a U.S. national.

The Spanish term  ("North American") is frequently used to refer things and persons from the United States, but this term can also denote people and things from Canada and Mexico. Among Spanish-speakers, North America generally doesn't include Central America or the Caribbean.

In other languages, however, there is no possibility for confusion.

Conversely, in Czech, there is no possibility for disambiguation. Američan (m.) and američanka (f.) can refer to persons from the United States or from the continents of the Americas, and there is no specific word capable of distinguishing the two meanings. For this reason, the latter meaning is very rarely used, and word  is used almost exclusively to refer to persons from the United States. The usage is exactly parallel to the English word.

Korean and Vietnamese also use unambiguous terms, with Korean having  for the country versus  for the continents, and Vietnamese having  for the country versus  for the continents. Japanese has such terms as well ( [ versus  []), but they are found more in newspaper headlines than in speech, where  predominates.

Likewise, the Esperanto word  refers to the continents. For the country there is the term .

History

The name America was coined by Martin Waldseemüller  from Americus Vespucius, the Latinized version of the name of Amerigo Vespucci (1454–1512), the Italian explorer who mapped South America's east coast and the Caribbean Sea in the early 16th century. Later, Vespucci's published letters were the basis of Waldseemüller's 1507 map, which is the first usage of America. The adjective American subsequently denoted the New World.

In the 16th century, European usage of American denoted the native inhabitants of the New World. The earliest recorded use of this term in English is in Thomas Hacket's 1568 translation of André Thévet's book France Antarctique; Thévet himself had referred to the natives as Ameriques. In the following century, the term was extended to European settlers and their descendants in the Americas. The earliest recorded use of "English-American" dates to 1648, in Thomas Gage's The English-American his travail by sea and land: or, a new survey of the West India's.

In English, American was used especially for people in British America.  Samuel Johnson, the leading English lexicographer, wrote in 1775, before the United States declared independence: "That the Americans are able to bear taxation is indubitable." The Declaration of Independence of July 1776 refers to "[the] unanimous Declaration of the thirteen United States of America" adopted by the "Representatives of the United States of America" on July 4, 1776. The official name of the country was reaffirmed on November 15, 1777, when the Second Continental Congress adopted the Articles of Confederation, the first of which says, "The Stile of this Confederacy shall be 'The United States of America'". The Articles further state:

Thomas Jefferson, newly elected president in May 1801 wrote, "I am sure the measures I mean to pursue are such as would in their nature be approved by every American who can emerge from preconceived prejudices; as for those who cannot, we must take care of them as of the sick in our hospitals. The medicine of time and fact may cure some of them."

In The Federalist Papers (1787–88), Alexander Hamilton and James Madison used the adjective American with two different meanings: one political and one geographic; "the American republic" in Federalist No. 51 and in Federalist No. 70, and, in Federalist No. 24, Hamilton used American to denote the lands beyond the U.S.'s political borders.

Early official U.S. documents show inconsistent usage; the 1778 Treaty of Alliance with France used "the United States of North America" in the first sentence, then "the said United States" afterwards; "the United States of America" and "the United States of North America" derive from "the United Colonies of America" and "the United Colonies of North America". The Treaty of Peace and Amity of September 5, 1795, between the United States and the Barbary States contains the usages "the United States of North America", "citizens of the United States", and "American Citizens".

U.S. President George Washington, in his 1796 Farewell Address, declaimed that "The name of American, which belongs to you in your national capacity, must always exalt the just pride of patriotism more than any appellation." Political scientist Virginia L. Arbery notes that, in his Farewell Address: "...Washington invites his fellow citizens to view themselves now as Americans who, out of their love for the truth of liberty, have replaced their maiden names (Virginians, South Carolinians, New Yorkers, etc.) with that of “American”. Get rid of, he urges, “any appellation derived from local discriminations.” By defining himself as an American rather than as a Virginian, Washington set the national standard for all citizens. "Over and over, Washington said that America must be something set apart. As he put it to Patrick Henry, 'In a word, I want an American character, that the powers of Europe may be convinced we act for ourselves and not for others.'" As the historian Garry Wills has noted: "This was a theme dear to Washington. He wrote to Timothy Pickering that the nation 'must never forget that we are Americans; the remembrance of which will convince us we ought not to be French or English'." Washington's countrymen subsequently embraced his exhortation with notable enthusiasm.

This semantic divergence among North American anglophones, however, remained largely unknown in the Spanish-American colonies. In 1801, the document titled Letter to American Spaniards—published in French (1799), in Spanish (1801), and in English (1808)—might have influenced Venezuela's Act of Independence and its 1811 constitution.

The Latter-day Saints' Articles of Faith refer to the American continents as where they are to build Zion.

Common short forms and abbreviations are the United States, the U.S., the U.S.A., and America; colloquial versions include the U.S. of A. and the States. The term Columbia (from the Columbus surname) was a popular name for the U.S. and for the entire geographic Americas; its usage is present today in the District of Columbia's name. Moreover, the womanly personification of Columbia appears in some official documents, including editions of the U.S. dollar.

Usage at the United Nations
Use of the term American for U.S. nationals is common at the United Nations, and financial markets in the United States are referred to as "American financial markets".

American Samoa, an unincorporated territory of the United States, is a recognized territorial name at the United Nations.

Cultural views

Spain and Hispanic America
The use of American as a national demonym for U.S. nationals is challenged, primarily by Hispanic Americans. Spanish speakers in Spain and Latin America use the term  to refer to people and things from the United States (from ), while  refers to the continents as a whole. The term  is also accepted in many parts of Latin America to refer to a person or something from the United States; however, this term may be ambiguous in certain parts. The Real Academia Española advised against using  exclusively for U.S. nationals:

Canada
Modern Canadians typically refer to people from the United States as Americans, though they seldom refer to the United States as America; they use the terms the United States, the U.S., or (informally) the States instead. Because of anti-American sentiment or simply national pride, Canadians never apply the term American to themselves.  Not being an "American" is a part of Canadian identity, with many Canadians resenting being referred to as Americans or mistaken for U.S. citizens. This is often due to others' inability, particularly overseas, to distinguish Canadians from Americans, by their accent or other cultural attributes. Some Canadians have protested the use of American as a national demonym. People of U.S. ethnic origin in Canada are categorized as "Other North American origins" by Statistics Canada for purposes of census counts.

Portugal and Brazil
Generally,  denotes "U.S. citizen" in Portugal.

In Brazil, the term  is used to address both that which pertains to the Americas and that which pertains to the U.S.; the particular meaning is deduced from context. Alternatively, the term  ("North American") is also used in more informal contexts, while  (of the U.S.) is the preferred form in academia. Use of the three terms is common in schools, government, and media.

In other contexts
"American" in the 1994 Associated Press Stylebook was defined as, "An acceptable description for a resident of the United States. It also may be applied to any resident or citizen of nations in North or South America." Elsewhere, the AP Stylebook indicates that "United States" must "be spelled out when used as a noun. Use U.S. (no space) only as an adjective."

The entry for "America" in The New York Times Manual of Style and Usage from 1999 reads:

Media releases from the Pope and Holy See frequently use "America" to refer to the United States, and "American" to denote something or someone from the United States.

International law

At least one international law uses U.S. citizen in defining a citizen of the United States rather than American citizen; for example, the English version of the North American Free Trade Agreement includes:

Many international treaties use the terms American and American citizen:
 1796 – The treaty between the United States and the Dey of the Regency of Algiers on March 7, 1796, protected "American citizens".
 1806 – The Louisiana Purchase Treaty between France and United States referred to "American citizens".
 1825 – The treaty between the United States and the Cheyenne tribe refers to "American citizen"s.
 1848 – The Treaty of Guadalupe Hidalgo between Mexico and the U.S. uses "American Government" to refer to the United States, and "American tribunals" to refer to U.S. courts.
 1858 – The Treaty of Amity and Commerce between the United States and Japan protected "American citizens" and also used "American" in other contexts.
 1966 – The United States–Thailand Treaty of Amity protects "Americans" and "American corporations".

U.S. commercial regulation
Products that are labeled, advertised, and marketed in the U.S. as "Made in the USA" must be, as set by the Federal Trade Commission (FTC), "all or virtually all made in the U.S." The FTC, to prevent deception of customers and unfair competition, considers an unqualified claim of "American Made" to expressly claim exclusive manufacture in the U.S: "The FTC Act gives the Commission the power to bring law enforcement actions against false or misleading claims that a product is of U.S. origin."

Alternatives

There are a number of alternatives to the demonym American as a citizen of the United States that do not simultaneously mean any inhabitant of the Americas. One uncommon alternative is Usonian, which usually describes a certain style of residential architecture designed by Frank Lloyd Wright. Other alternatives have also surfaced, but most have fallen into disuse and obscurity. Merriam-Webster's Dictionary of English Usage says:

Nevertheless, no alternative to American is common.

See also

 Americas (terminology)
 Hyphenated Americans
 Names of the United States
 Naming of the Americas
 Totum pro parte

Notes

References

Works cited

External links

 

American culture
English words
Geographical naming disputes
Definitions